Pentecostal School is an Anglo-Chinese secondary school in Hong Kong at 1973. The schools starting off as a school and then became fully in 1982. The school are a "Love, Faith and Hope" at it.

Location

Pentecostal School are in Ho Man Tin, Kowloon, Hong Kong. It consisting two building, one halls, one halls, two basketball court and one badminton court.

Education

Pentecostal School are divided seven, students aged 13 to 18. Forms one to Forms three, students is taught by Chinese, English, Mathematics. Forms four and forms five study (HKCEE), student would have another two year of very future study.

Junior

Forms one to three
Classes A-E. Classes is very arranged in a way which given the students (an entry test or final of previous year) in A and decreases ability class E. This are approximately 40 student in an only class.

Compulsory subjects: Chinese, English, Maths

Senior

Forms four to five
Students onto three streams, science, art or even commerce. Depends on student's interests. E and D is concentrating on the sciences; class offers Computing but class D. Classes C and B on the arts; C is Economics, and class B does not. Lastly but not least, A offered.

Subjects: Chinese, English and Maths

a)Sciences
Addition Maths and Computer

b)Arts

History Chinese, History English

c)Commerce

Accounts, Econ

Forms six to seven

Extracurricular activities
This is many interest and activities by students, including basketball, Maths, English, Chinese.

External links
 http://ps.hkcampus.net/1school/index.html

Protestant secondary schools in Hong Kong 
Ho Man Tin